Peachtree Financial Tower was a proposed skyscraper planned to be built in Atlanta, Georgia, in 2012. The height was increased and the location changed several times.

References

Proposed skyscrapers in the United States